Quinton Howden (born January 21, 1992) is a Canadian professional ice hockey forward who is currently an unrestricted free agent. He last played for Kölner Haie of the Deutsche Eishockey Liga (DEL). He was drafted by the Florida Panthers in the first round of the 2010 NHL Entry Draft, 25th overall. He was also selected to play in the 2011 and 2012 World Junior Ice Hockey Championships for Canada.

Playing career
Howden started playing minor hockey when he was five. Before starting to play hockey, he broke his femur in a bicycle accident, and had to spend two months in a cast from chest to toe. As a result of the injury, his doctors doubted he would be a very good athlete.

Howden was the first overall choice in the 2007 Western Hockey League (WHL) Bantam Draft by the Moose Jaw Warriors. After weighing his options between National Collegiate Athletic Association (NCAA) hockey and the WHL, Howden chose to sign with the Warriors shortly after the draft. Howden played five games with the Warriors as an affiliate player during the 2007–08 season, before joining the club full-time for the 2008–09 season. He had a relatively quiet rookie season, but really came out in his sophomore season setting a point-per-game pace.

After a 65-point season with Moose Jaw, Howden was drafted in the first round, 25th overall, in the 2010 NHL Entry Draft by the Florida Panthers. In 2011, he signed a three-year, entry-level contract with Florida but was sent back to Moose Jaw for his final year of junior. In the 2012–13 season, he split time between Florida and their American Hockey League (AHL) affiliate; in 18 games with Florida, he had no points.

After four seasons within the Panthers' organization, Howden failed to receive a qualifying offer and therefore left as a free agent to sign a one-year, two-way contract with the Winnipeg Jets on July 1, 2016.

After spending the majority of the 2016–17 season with the Jets' AHL affiliate, the Manitoba Moose, Howden failed to receive a qualifying offer.

As a free agent, Howden signed with Dinamo Minsk of the Kontinental Hockey League (KHL) on August 18, 2017. 

After two seasons in Belarus with Dinamo Minsk, Howden left as a free agent to sign a one-year contract to continue in the KHL with Russian outfit, Torpedo Nizhny Novgorod on August 6, 2019. In the 2019–20 season, Howden posted 7 goals and 13 points in 36 games before he was traded by Torpedo to HC Vityaz on December 23, 2019. In the second half of the season, Howden in a top 6 scoring role contributed with 4 goals and 7 points in 19 games. He made his KHL playoff debut with Vityaz, finishing as the club's leading goalscorer with 2 goals in a 4 games series sweep defeat to SKA Saint Petersburg.

International play

Howden was invited to take part in Canada's 2011 National Junior Team selection camp  He then participated at the 2011 World Junior Ice Hockey Championships in Buffalo, New York, winning the silver medal; and the 2012 World Junior Ice Hockey Championships in Canada, winning bronze. In 2018, Howden won a bronze medal after he was chosen to represent Canada at the 2018 Winter Olympics.

Personal life
Howden's younger brother Brett was drafted 27th overall by the Tampa Bay Lightning in the 2016 NHL Entry Draft.

Howden married Cassandra Tremblay on August 10, 2017.

Career statistics

Regular season and playoffs

International

References

External links

1992 births
Living people
Canadian ice hockey left wingers
Canadian expatriate ice hockey players in Belarus
HC Dinamo Minsk players
Florida Panthers draft picks
Florida Panthers players
Ice hockey people from Manitoba
Kölner Haie players
Manitoba Moose players
Moose Jaw Warriors players
People from Oakbank, Manitoba
Olympic ice hockey players of Canada
Ice hockey players at the 2018 Winter Olympics
Olympic bronze medalists for Canada
Medalists at the 2018 Winter Olympics
Olympic medalists in ice hockey
National Hockey League first-round draft picks
San Antonio Rampage players
Torpedo Nizhny Novgorod players
Winnipeg Jets players
HC Vityaz players